Torreyochloa is a genus of North American and northeast Asian plants in the grass family. False mannagrass is a common name for plants in this genus.

 Species
 Torreyochloa erecta (Hitchc.) Church - western United States (CA NV OR)
 Torreyochloa fernaldii (Hitchc.) Church - Canada (all provinces except Alberta), United States (Northeast, Great Lakes)
 Torreyochloa natans (Kom.) Church - Japan, Russia (Amur, Kamchatka, Khabarovsk, Kuril, Primorye Sakhalin, Magadan)
 Torreyochloa pallida (Torr.) Church - Japan, Russia (Kamchatka, Sakhalin), Canada (Yukon + all 10 provinces), United States (primarily Northeast, Great Lakes, western mountains, Alaska).
 Torreyochloa pauciflora (J.Presl) Church - Canada (Yukon, British Columbia, Alberta), United States (AK CO ID MT OR WA WY SD AZ CA NV UT NM)

References

External links
 Grassbase - The World Online Grass Flora

Pooideae
Poaceae genera